José Sebastián Brusco (born October 8, 1974) is a formed Argentine football defender.

Brusco was born in Villa María, Córdoba. He started his professional playing career in 1993 with Belgrano de Córdoba. In 1996, he joined Racing Club de Avellaneda

In 1999, he had a short spell with Toros Neza in Mexico before returning to Argentina to play for Godoy Cruz and then Instituto de Córdoba in the 2nd division.

In 2001 Brusco returned to Belgrano de Córdoba before moving to Gimnasia y Esgrima de La Plata. In 2003, he returned for a 3rd spell with Belgrano de Córdoba where he stayed until 2005.

In 2005 Brusco joined Bolivian side Blooming and won the Apertura tournament that same year. The following season he was signed by San Martín de San Juan with which later gained promotion to the Argentine Primera after defeating Huracán on a 3-2 aggregated. After a couple of years with San Martín, Brusco changed colors by joining Independiente Rivadavia.

Club titles

External links
 Football-Lineups player profile
 Futbol 91 profile

1974 births
Living people
Sportspeople from Córdoba Province, Argentina
Argentine footballers
Argentine expatriate footballers
Association football defenders
Liga MX players
Argentine Primera División players
Club Atlético Belgrano footballers
Racing Club de Avellaneda footballers
Godoy Cruz Antonio Tomba footballers
Instituto footballers
Club de Gimnasia y Esgrima La Plata footballers
Club Blooming players
San Martín de San Juan footballers
Argentine expatriate sportspeople in Bolivia
Independiente Rivadavia footballers
Expatriate footballers in Bolivia
Expatriate footballers in Mexico
Toros Neza footballers